The Azerbaijan men's national under-20 basketball team is a national basketball team of Azerbaijan, administered by the Azerbaijan Basketball Federation. It represents the country in men's international under-20 basketball competitions.

FIBA U20 European Championship participations

See also
Azerbaijan men's national basketball team
Azerbaijan men's national under-18 basketball team

References

External links
Archived records of Azerbaijan team participations

Azerbaijan national basketball team
Men's national under-20 basketball teams